Mazahir Hamid oghlu Abasov (December 12, 1918 — February 2002) was an aviator, doctor of historical sciences, professor, laureate of the Shohrat Order.

Biography 
Mazahir Abasov was born on December 12, 1918, in Mashtaga.

Since 1942, he worked in the Soviet and party organs of the city of Baku and districts of Azerbaijan. In 1955, he was elected a deputy of the Supreme Soviet of the Azerbaijan SSR and a member of the Baku Committee of the Azerbaijan Communist Party. Since 1963, he had been working at the Institute of History of the ANAS. Doctor of Historical Sciences, Professor at Azerbaijan State University. Author of a number of books devoted to the Great Patriotic War.

M. Abasov died in February 2002 in Baku.

Great Patriotic War 
In 1940, he graduated from Yeysk Flight School and was promoted to lieutenant commander of the flight crew of the 5th Air Squadron of the 2nd Mine-Torpedo Air Regiment of the 63rd Air Brigade of the Black Sea Fleet. Mazahir entered the war from the very first day as a pilot of the DB-3f long-range bomber. On August 31, 1941, while performing a combat mission, he was seriously wounded and after long-term treatment in a hospital, he was discharged from the army in 1942.

Memorial 
On the occasion of the 85th anniversary of Mazahir Abasov's birth, the book "Legendary Pilot, Wise Man" was written in 2004, and on the occasion of the 90th anniversary the book "Legendary Pilot Mazahir Abasov" was written in 2008. In 2014, ITV made a biographical film about Mazahir Abasov.

Awards

References 

Academic staff of Baku State University
Soviet military personnel of World War II from Azerbaijan
Azerbaijani aviators
Recipients of the Shohrat Order
Recipients of the Order of the Red Banner
1918 births
2002 deaths
Soviet aviators
Soviet academics